Hopkins Park is a small  urban park in the neighborhood of Mt. Auburn, Cincinnati, Ohio.

The land was donated by merchant Lewis C. Hopkins on January 18, 1866 on the condition that the park "forever be kept free of buildings, and ... should be tastefully laid out and planted with trees and shrubbery".

References

Parks in Cincinnati
Mount Auburn, Cincinnati